The Associated Press NFL Most Valuable Player Award is presented annually by the Associated Press (AP) to a player in the National Football League (NFL) deemed to have been the "most valuable" in that year's regular season. While there have been many selectors of NFL MVPs in the past, today the MVP award presented by the AP is considered the de facto official NFL MVP award and the most prestigious. Since 2011, the NFL has held the annual NFL Honors ceremony to recognize the winner of each year's AP MVP award, along with other AP awards, such as the AP NFL Offensive Player of the Year and AP NFL Defensive Player of the Year. The most recent AP NFL MVP is quarterback Patrick Mahomes of the Kansas City Chiefs.

The AP has presented an award recognizing the NFL's top player since 1957. The award is voted upon by a panel of 50 sportswriters at the end of the regular season, before the playoffs, though the results are not announced to the public until the day before the Super Bowl. The sportswriters chosen regularly follow the NFL, and remain mostly consistent from year to year. They are chosen based on expertise and are independent of the league itself. Voters for the award have included Troy Aikman of Fox Sports; Cris Collinsworth and Tony Dungy of NBC Sports; and Herm Edwards of ESPN. Only two players in the history of the award have won it unanimously: New England Patriots  quarterback Tom Brady in 2010 and Baltimore Ravens quarterback Lamar Jackson in 2019.

Due to voters' tendency to favor offensive positions, the award has been overwhelmingly dominated by offensive players; of the 57 undisputed winners, 54 played an offensive position: 38 quarterbacks and 16 running backs. Two defensive players have won the award: Alan Page in 1971 as a defensive tackle, and Lawrence Taylor as a linebacker in 1986. The sole special teams player to be named AP NFL MVP was Mark Moseley, who won as a placekicker in 1982.

Thirteen awardees also won the Super Bowl (or NFL Championship Game prior to 1966) in the same season. However, this did not occur from 1999 to 2022. During that span, nine AP NFL MVPs have led their team to the Super Bowl and were defeated each time. This has led to tongue-in-cheek claims in recent years that there is a "curse" preventing the awardee's team from winning the Super Bowl.

Six NFL franchises have not produced an MVP, the New York Jets (not counting Joe Namath's two AFL MVPs), Houston Texans, Jacksonville Jaguars, Chicago/St. Louis/Phoenix/Arizona Cardinals, New Orleans Saints, and the Tampa Bay Buccaneers.

The Green Bay Packers have the most overall winners with ten; if including disputed awards (see below), the Colts would be tied with ten. The Green Bay Packers also have the most unique winners with five players winning the award.

Discrepancies
The AP has presented an award recognizing the NFL's top player since the 1957 season, although the pre-1961 awardees are recognized in the Official NFL Record and Fact Book as winning the AP's "NFL Most Outstanding Player Award", and the 1962 winner was recognized as the AP's "Player of the Year". The AP considers 1961 to be the first year in which it presented a "Most Valuable Player" award. Thus there are numerous inconsistencies among sources regarding each of the first four awards, and whether or not the winners are included in the overall list of AP MVP winners at all. The discrepancies include 1958's winner being either Jim Brown or Gino Marchetti; the 1959 winner as Johnny Unitas or Charlie Conerly; and whether or not Norm Van Brocklin shared the award in 1960 with Joe Schmidt.

MVP Super bowl curse 
In recent years, if a player that won the MVP makes it to the Super Bowl, the MVP often loses the Super Bowl in the year they won the MVP. That includes, Kurt Warner in 2001, Rich Gannon in 2002, Shaun Alexander in 2005, Tom Brady in 2007, Peyton Manning in 2009 and 2013, Cam Newton in 2015, Matt Ryan in 2016, and Tom Brady in 2017.

Eleven players have won the Super Bowl and MVP in the same season: Bart Starr in 1966, Terry Bradshaw in 1978, Mark Moseley in 1982, Lawrence Taylor in 1986,  Joe Montana in 1989, Emmitt Smith in 1993, Steve Young in 1994, Brett Favre in 1996, Terrell Davis in 1998,  Kurt Warner in 1999, and  Patrick Mahomes in 2022. In these eleven cases, all but four regular season MVP winners were also the Super Bowl MVP for their respective games - with Moseley, Taylor, Favre, and Davis not completing the duplicate MVP year.

This curse was broken by Patrick Mahomes in Super Bowl LVII.

Winners

Multiple-time winners

See also
 National Football League Most Valuable Player Award for an overview of similar awards from other organizations
 Associated Press NFL Offensive Player of the Year Award
 Associated Press NFL Defensive Player of the Year Award
 Associated Press NFL Coach of the Year Award
 Super Bowl Most Valuable Player Award

References
General
 
 
 

Footnotes

National Football League trophies and awards
Most valuable player awards